Harvey Samuel Firestone Sr. (December 20, 1868 – February 7, 1938) was an American businessman, and the founder of the Firestone Tire and Rubber Company, one of the first global makers of automobile tires.

Family background
Firestone was born on the Columbiana, Ohio farm built by his paternal grandfather.  He was the second of Benjamin and Catherine (née Flickinger) Firestone's three sons; Benjamin had a son and a daughter by his first wife. In 1983 the original farm was disassembled and moved to Greenfield Village, an  historical site founded by Henry Ford, and is now part of a larger outdoor museum.

Firestone's paternal great-great-great-grandfather, Hans Nicholas Feuerstein, immigrated from Berg, Bas-Rhin, France, in 1753, and settled in Pennsylvania. Three of Nicholas' sons – including Harvey's great-great-grandfather, Johan Nicholas – changed their surname to "Firestone", the English translation of the family's German name "Feuerstein".

On November 20, 1895, Firestone married Idabelle Smith. They eventually had seven children. Notable great-grandchildren include: Andrew Firestone, Nick Firestone, and William Clay Ford Jr. (the son of Henry Ford's grandson and Harvey and Idabelle's granddaughter Martha).

Education and career
 
After graduating from Columbiana High School, Firestone worked for the Columbus Buggy Company in Columbus, Ohio before starting his own company in 1890, making rubber tires for carriages. In 1900 he soon saw the huge potential for marketing tires for automobiles and then founded the Firestone Tire and Rubber Company, a pioneer in the mass production of tires. In 1926 he published a book, Men and Rubber: The Story of Business, which was written in collaboration with Samuel Crowther.

Death
In 1938, Firestone died of coronary thrombosis.

The Vagabonds 
Firestone, Henry Ford, and Thomas Edison were generally considered the three leaders in American industry at the time, and often worked and vacationed together, calling themselves the Vagabonds, along with naturalist John Burroughs and, sometimes, President Herbert Hoover.

Legacy
The main library of Princeton University is named Firestone Library in his honor. It is among the largest university libraries in the world. On August 3, 1950, the Harvey S Firestone Memorial, a large sculpture ensemble dedicated to Firestone, created by sculptors James Earle Fraser and Donald De Lue was dedicated. It is located at Bridgestone Firestone Inc., 1200 Firestone Parkway in Akron, Ohio. In 1974, Firestone was inducted into the Automotive Hall of Fame. Firestone High School in Akron, Ohio, is named in his honor. There is a Harvey S Firestone Park in Columbiana, Ohio. The town Harbel in Liberia, home to Firestone's rubber plantation, the largest in the world, is named after Firestone and his wife Idabelle.

He was inducted into the Motorsports Hall of Fame of America in 2013.

See also
 Firestone Stadium

References

Further reading
 Firestone, Harvey Samuel, and Samuel Crowther. Men and rubber: The story of business (Doubleday, Page, 1926) online
 Knoll, Arthur J. "Harvey S. Firestone's Liberian Investment (1922-1932)." Liberian Studies Journal 14.1 (1989): 13-33. online

 Newton, James Draper. Uncommon Friends: Life with Thomas Edison, Henry Ford, Harvey Firestone, Alexis Carrel, and Charles Lindbergh (Houghton Mifflin Harcourt, 1987).

 Skrabec Jr, Quentin R. Rubber: An American Industrial History (McFarland, 2013).

External links

 
 

1868 births
1938 deaths
Firestone family
People from Columbiana, Ohio
Businesspeople from Akron, Ohio
Tire industry people
Henry Ford family
American automotive pioneers
Asheville School alumni
Deaths from coronary thrombosis